Events from the year 1664 in Ireland.

Incumbent
Monarch: Charles II

Events
St Stephen's Green, Dublin, enclosed for building.
Portmore Castle is erected near the shores of Portmore Lough in County Antrim.

Publications
Roger Boyle, 1st Earl of Orrery's plays The General and Henry V.
Sir James Ware's history Rerum Hibernicarum Annales ab Anno Domini 1485 ad Annum 1558.

Births
Almeric de Courcy, 23rd Baron Kingsale, peer (d. 1720)

Deaths
March 5 – Wentworth FitzGerald, 17th Earl of Kildare, politician (b. 1634)

References